The women's triple jump event at the 2010 World Junior Championships in Athletics was held in Moncton, New Brunswick, Canada, at Moncton Stadium on 21 and 22 July.

Medalists

Results

Final
22 July

Qualifications
21 July

Group A

Group B

Participation
According to an unofficial count, 28 athletes from 25 countries participated in the event.

References

Triple jump
Triple jump at the World Athletics U20 Championships
2010 in women's athletics